Angkor Tiger Football Club is a Cambodian professional football club based in Siem Reap City, Siem Reap province. Founded in 2015, It plays in the Cambodian Premier League, the top tier of Cambodian football. The club is owned by businessman Akihiro Kato.

Kits
The kits are manufactured by NT Sports.

Spectators
In 2018, at the Cambodia Football Award which was hosted by the Cambodian Football League, it won the award for the most popular club in Cambodia.

Players

Honours
Hun Sen Cup
3rd: 2015
Quarter-final: 2016
Round of 16: 2016
Round of 16: 2017
Semi-final: 2018

Cambodian League
5th: 2014
4th: 2015
6th: 2016
7th: 2017
8th: 2018
5th: 2019
7th: 2020
6th: 2021

Head coaches

References

External links
 
 Soccerway
 

 
Football clubs in Cambodia
2013 establishments in Cambodia